Winnenden station is a station in Winnenden in Baden-Württemberg, Germany. It lies on the Waiblingen–Schwäbisch Hall railway a few hundred metres northwest of the town centre and about one kilometre south of Leutenbach. The station is served by Regional-Express and Stuttgart S-Bahn trains. DB designates it as a class 3 station.

History
The station was opened with the construction of the line, which was opened on 26 October 1876. At that time, platform 1 (next to the station building) was on a through track. With the duplication of the Waiblingen–Schwäbisch Hall railway from 1962 to 1965, major changes were made to the station tracks, which were electrified and integrated into the Stuttgart suburban rail network. The tracks were shifted slightly on both sides of the station, since then tracks 2 and 3 have been the through tracks. With the upgrade for the S-Bahn around 1980, the platforms were raised to a height of 96 cm. The freight sidings north of the entrance building have been replaced by a park + ride area. The fourth track, which had no platform, was also dismantled.

Forecourt
In front of the station there are several park and ride parking spaces, a station kiosk, bicycle parking spaces and a taxi rank. A Deutsche Bahn Travel Center and toilets are located on the ground floor of the entrance building. Rental apartments are provided on the upper floors.

Platforms
The station has three platform faces, including platform 1 next to the station building and an island platform (platforms 2 and 3). Platform 1 is no longer used in scheduled passenger traffic, platform 2 is used by Regional-Express and S-Bahn trains towards Backnang, while platform 3 is used for services to Stuttgart. The station is located in fare zone 3 of the Verkehrs- und Tarifverbund Stuttgart (VVS) area.

Train services

Bus services
Bus routes 210, 310, 330, 331, 332, 334, 335, 336, 337, 340 and 456 connect the station with the surrounding area, running from the Winnenden central bus station, which is located directly in front of the station.

References

Footnotes

Sources

Railway stations in Baden-Württemberg
Railway stations in Germany opened in 1876
1876 establishments in Germany
Buildings and structures in Rems-Murr-Kreis
Stuttgart S-Bahn stations